Sikorzyn may refer to the following places:
Sikorzyn, Gostyń County in Greater Poland Voivodeship (west-central Poland)
Sikorzyn, Kościan County in Greater Poland Voivodeship (west-central Poland)
Sikorzyn, Rawicz County in Greater Poland Voivodeship (west-central Poland)